Eisenbrauns, an imprint of Penn State University Press, is an academic publisher specializing in the ancient Near East and biblical studies. They publish approximately twenty new books and reference works each year, as well as reprinting out-of-print books relating to biblical studies. 

Eisenbrauns was founded by Jim and Merna Eisenbraun in 1975 in Ann Arbor, Michigan. It operated for over forty years in Winona Lake, Indiana, and Warsaw, Indiana before its acquisition by Penn State University Press in 2017.

External links
Eisenbrauns official website

Book publishing companies based in Pennsylvania
Book publishing companies based in Indiana
Book publishing companies based in Michigan
Publishing companies established in 1975
Companies based in Ann Arbor, Michigan
Biblical studies